George Canyon (born Frederick George Lays, August 22, 1970) is a Canadian country music singer. He was the runner up on the second season of Nashville Star in 2004.  He grew up in Fox Brook, Pictou County, Nova Scotia before he moved west to Calgary, Alberta. He also holds an appointment in the Canadian Forces as the Colonel Commandant of the Royal Canadian Air Cadets.

Biography
George Canyon has held many jobs: he spent time working as a bylaw enforcement officer/special constable, a slaughterhouse beef inspector, and the owner/operator of his own recording studio. He always dreamed of becoming a professional musician.
    
Canyon is the father of two children. His wife worked three jobs during the day so that he could sing at night. In 2004, George Canyon competed in Nashville Star 2. He was the runner-up in the competition, but became very well known in Canada and garnered much support, being the only Canadian to make the cut for the competition. After the competition ended, he received many accolades from fans and the industry alike. These include the top 5 hit "My Name", a Juno Award for Best Country Recording of the Year (for his album One Good Friend), and, four Canadian Country Music Awards Nominations (CCMAs) including Male Vocalist of the Year and the Fan Choice Award.

On September 22, 2007, Canyon performed at China-Canada: Hand in Hand; a joint concert held in Vancouver between CCTV (China Central Television) and CBC (Canadian Broadcasting Corporation) to commemorate the one-year countdown of the 2008 Beijing Olympics.  One of the songs performed by Canyon was "What a Fine Jasmine Blossom". Sung entirely in Mandarin, Canyon performed the duet with Mandarin singer Tang Can.

On January 9, 2008, Canadian defence minister Peter MacKay appointed Canyon to the position of honorary colonel at 14 Wing Greenwood, the largest air base on the east coast. After this appointment expired in December 2011, Canyon was appointed colonel commandant of the Royal Canadian Air Cadets.
 
Canyon was diagnosed with type 1 diabetes at the age of 14 and has given talks to children about diabetes.

On October 16, 2014, Canyon was named the official anthem singer for the Calgary Flames of the National Hockey League.

In 2020, Canyon will appear as a panelist on Canada Reads, advocating for Jesse Thistle's memoir From the Ashes.

Acting
In addition to his singing career, Canyon has also performed as an actor in movies and television. His first role of note was as "Head Forest Ranger" in several episodes during the seventh season of the popular Showcase television series Trailer Park Boys in 2007. He also appeared as the character "Charlie Wells" in the series Heartland in 2008. His most notable film role to date was as the character "Cattle Jack" in the 2012 film Dawn Rider, a remake of a 1935 John Wayne film of the same name. In 2013, he had role on the movie Coming Home for Christmas and Hallmark channel's One Starry Christmas.

Politics
In 2014, Canyon briefly ran for the Conservative Party of Canada nomination in the newly created riding of Bow River before withdrawing from the race later that year. On August 21, 2019, Canyon was announced as the Conservative candidate for the riding of Central Nova for the federal election later that year, ultimately coming second to Liberal incumbent Sean Fraser.

Band
 Jay Buettner (Guitar)
 Michael Lent (Bass)
 Adam Dowling (Drums)
 Mike Little (Keyboard & Accordion)

Discography

Awards and nominations

Juno Awards

Canadian Country Music Association Awards

Other awards
 2004 – winner, Music Industry of Nova Scotia, New Artist Recording of the Year – for the album George Canyon
 2004 – winner, Music Industry of Nova Scotia, Country Recording of the Year – for the album George Canyon
2005 – winner, The East Coast Music Awards, Galaxie Rising Star
2005 – winner, The East Coast Music Awards, Country Recording of the Year – for the album One Good Friend
2005 – winner, The East Coast Music Awards, Entertainer of the Year
2005 – winner, Canadian Radio Music Awards, Best New Group or Solo Artist (Country) for his single Good Day To Ride
2005 – winner, Music Box Awards (Paris, France), New Artist Male US/Canada
2005 – winner, 2005 Nova Scotia Crystal Tourism Awards of Excellence, Ambassador Award
2006 – winner, ECMA, Entertainer of the Year
2007 – winner, ECMA, Entertainer of the Year
2007 – winner, ECMA, Country Recording of the Year
2007 – winner, ECMA, Video of the Year, for the video Drinkin' Thinkin'''
2007 – nominee, ECMA, Best Album of the Year, for the album Somebody Wrote Love''.
2008 – winner, ECMA, Entertainer of the Year

References

External links 
 
 George Canyon at Canadian Bands

1970 births
Calgary Flames
Canadian country singers
Juno Award for Country Album of the Year winners
Living people
Musicians from Calgary
Musicians from Nova Scotia
Nashville Star contestants
People from New Glasgow, Nova Scotia
People with type 1 diabetes
Canadian Country Music Association Male Artist of the Year winners
Canadian Country Music Association Rising Star Award winners
Canadian Country Music Association Fans' Choice Award winners
21st-century American singers
21st-century Canadian male singers
Candidates in the 2019 Canadian federal election
Conservative Party of Canada candidates for the Canadian House of Commons
Nova Scotia candidates for Member of Parliament